Hermas Walter McFarland (March 11, 1870 – September 21, 1935) was a professional baseball player. He played all or part of five seasons in Major League Baseball for the Louisville Colonels (1896), Cincinnati Reds (1898), Chicago White Sox (1901–02) and Baltimore Orioles/New York Highlanders (1902–03), primarily as an outfielder.

Born in Des Moines, Iowa, McFarland was a member of the White Sox team that won the 1901 American League pennant. In 5 seasons he played in 352 games and had 1,278 at bats, 204 runs, 340 hits, 61 doubles, 28 triples, 13 home runs, 167 RBI, 64 stolen bases, 175 walks, .266 batting average, .362 on-base percentage, .388 slugging percentage, 496 total bases and 26 sacrifice hits.

He died in Richmond, Virginia at the age of 65.

Sources

Major League Baseball left fielders
Major League Baseball center fielders
Louisville Colonels players
Cincinnati Reds players
Chicago White Sox players
Baltimore Orioles (1901–02) players
New York Highlanders players
Lincoln Rustlers players
Des Moines Prohibitionist players
Des Moines Prohibitionists players
St. Joseph Saints players
Des Moines Indians players
Quincy Bluebirds players
Indianapolis Indians players
Indianapolis Hoosiers (minor league) players
Chicago White Stockings (minor league) players
Providence Clamdiggers (baseball) players
York Penn Parks players
Wilmington Peaches players
Portsmouth Truckers players
Petersburg Goobers players
Baseball players from Des Moines, Iowa
19th-century baseball players
1870 births
1935 deaths
Richmond Rebels players